The Louisiana State University Athletic Hall of Fame recognizes members of the LSU Tigers and Lady Tigers athletics program that have made a lasting impact on Louisiana State University (LSU).  To be eligible for the Hall of Fame in the Athlete category, an individual must have earned a college degree and gained national distinction through superlative performance. Hall of Fame candidates must also have established a personal reputation for character and citizenship.  To be eligible in the Coach/Administrator category, the individual must have made significant contributions to LSU Athletics and gained national distinction through exceptional accomplishments in his or her field of expertise while establishing an image that reflects favorably upon the University.

The Jack and Priscilla Andonie Museum located on the campus of LSU in Baton Rouge, Louisiana is the physical location of the Hall of Fame.

Administrators

Athletic Council

Athletic training

Baseball

Members

Retired numbers

Men's basketball

Members

Retired numbers

Women's basketball

Members

Retired numbers

Boxing

Football

Members

Retired numbers

Men's golf

Women's golf

Gymnastics

Softball

Men's swimming & diving

Women's swimming & diving

Men's tennis

Men's track & field

Women's track & field

Volleyball

See also
LSU Tigers and Lady Tigers

References
LSU Hall of Fame Members

External links
LSU Athletic Hall of Fame

College sports halls of fame in the United States
Hall Of Fame
Halls of fame in Louisiana